The Vincent Thomas Bridge is a  suspension bridge, crossing Los Angeles Harbor in Los Angeles, California, linking San Pedro with Terminal Island. It is the only suspension bridge in the Greater Los Angeles area. The bridge is part of State Route 47, which is also known as the Seaside Freeway. The bridge opened in 1963 and is named for California Assemblyman Vincent Thomas of San Pedro, who championed its construction. It was the first welded suspension bridge in the United States and is now the fourth-longest suspension bridge in California and the 76th-longest span in the world.

History

Assemblyman Thomas, who represented San Pedro, spent 19 years beginning in 1940 arguing for the 16 different pieces of legislation that were necessary for its construction. During that time and in the years right after it was built, it was ridiculed as "The bridge to nowhere".

Other bridges to the island included the 1948 Commodore Heim lift bridge connecting SR 47 north and a WWII pontoon bridge from Ocean Blvd. to Long Beach (replaced in 1968 by the Gerald Desmond arch bridge). Until the new bridge's 1963 construction, ferry service from San Pedro was important to cannery and shipyard workers on Terminal Island; private ferries had begun in 1870, and municipal ferry service had begun in 1941. Some residents, including many women who worked at the canneries, tried unsuccessfully to keep one of the smaller pedestrian-only ferries operating after the new bridge's opening because the ferry was available at any time including night-shift hours but the new bus service involved long waits.

In 1968 the bridge was connected through SR 47 directly into the Harbor Freeway; having the bridge and connection available was cited by port officials as crucial to the port's success in the era of containerized cargo.  The cargo from the San Pedro side of the Port of Los Angeles travels over the Vincent Thomas bridge, onto the Terminal Island Freeway, to the southern end of the Long Beach Freeway, and then up to the rail yards of East Los Angeles.

At the 25th anniversary of its opening in 1988, events were held to raise money for $170,000 of permanent decorative lights for the bridge's main cables. In January 2005, after seventeen years of planning and fundraising, the decorative illumination was changed to 160 blue LED lamps, powered by solar panels, with a project cost of $1 million.

When the bridge opened in 1963, Vincent Thomas was the longest-serving assemblyman. In 1961, the legislature passed a special Concurrent Resolution 131 in order to name it after him while he was still serving.

Tolls
When the bridge opened in 1963, the toll was 25 cents in each direction, with the toll plaza on the Terminal Island side. In 1983, the toll increased to 50 cents for westbound traffic but became free for eastbound traffic. In 2000, tolls were eliminated on the Vincent Thomas Bridge, leaving the San Diego–Coronado Bridge as the only remaining toll bridge in Southern California. After the San Diego-Coronado Bridge stopped collecting tolls in 2002, the California Department of Transportation was able to devolve authority over toll bridges to the Bay Area Toll Authority in June 2005.

The toll plaza houses California Highway Patrol facilities.

Media location

Films

The bridge has featured in numerous movies such as the original 1974 Gone in 60 Seconds and the 2000 Gone in 60 Seconds remake, Lethal Weapon 2, To Live and Die in L.A., City of Angels, Charlie's Angels, Inception, and Den of Thieves.

In the 1995 film Heat, the bridge is mentioned by Robert De Niro's character when he points to the location and mistakenly refers to it as the "St. Vincent Thomas Bridge."

Television
The bridge's toll plaza is featured in a 1960s episode of the original series of Mission: Impossible where Mr. Phelps, played by Peter Graves, receives his instructions.

The bridge was also featured extensively in season 1/episode 7 of NBC's crime series, CHiPs, airing November 3, 1977, titled, "Taking Its Toll."  The old tollbooths were the center of the action, where bandits mugged drivers to steal contents from their cars.

The 1978 episode of NBC's Columbo entitled "The Conspirators" had a scene where Peter Falk's title character Lt. Columbo tries unsuccessfully to speed across the bridge in his iconic 1959 Peugeot convertible.

In August 2012, for the season three premiere of the History Channel's show Top Gear, the bridge was used as a finishing line for a closed course race.  The race was between professional driver Tanner Foust, who drove a 2009 Chevrolet Corvette Z06 police car, and professional stunt driver Ernie Vigil, who drove a Triumph 1050 Speed Triple motorcycle.

Video music
It was also the scene of the video "I Think I'm in Love with You" by Jessica Simpson.

Video games
The bridge was featured in the 2004 video game Grand Theft Auto: San Andreas as the Ocean Docks Bridge, and the 2013 video game Grand Theft Auto V as the Miriam Turner Overpass. The bridge is also featured in Need For Speed: Most Wanted as "Heflin Drive", in The Crew 2, and in Need For Speed as the South Port Bridge.

Notoriety 
On October 26, 1990, 1964 Olympic diving bronze medalist Larry Andreasen was killed jumping from the west tower of the bridge in an attempt to set a diving record.

On August 19, 2012, film director Tony Scott died from suicide by jumping from the bridge.

Los Angeles police say a suicide attempt is made from the bridge "every few months".

See also

 Gerald Desmond Bridge
 Terminal Island
 Tacoma Narrows Bridge a similar design with two towers in Washington

References

External links
 

Suspension bridges in California
Bridges in Los Angeles County, California
Road bridges in California
Los Angeles Harbor Region
San Pedro, Los Angeles
Terminal Island
Bridges completed in 1963
1963 establishments in California
Transportation buildings and structures in Los Angeles
Former toll bridges in California
Tourist attractions in Los Angeles